Pascal Voggenhuber (born February 11, 1980, in Switzerland) is a Swiss non-fiction, thriller author and Copywriter. He has published 15 books so far and was awarded the GfK Award  in 2017. He publishes his novels under his open pseudonym Chris Grail.

Education 
Voggenhuber claims to have acquired his (alleged) knowledge of the "supernatural world" at Arthur Findlay College in Stansted Mountfitchet, England, and in Switzerland. In 2009, he founded the Spirit Messenger Center in Sissach, Switzerland to train other media. Pascal Voggenhuber is originally a trained actor.

Working methods and demands 
Every year Pascal Voggenhuber gives a large number of lectures, seminars and workshops, mainly in Switzerland, Germany and Austria. He also appears regularly in so-called afterlife demonstrations. Numerous people follow Voggenhuber's performances, in which he says he talks live to a deceased relative of a spectator. He translates messages from the afterlife for the bereaved. In 2014, a multi-part documentary about the work of Pascal Voggenhuber was broadcast on Sat.1 Switzerland. The programme Das Medium - Nachricht aus dem Jenseits shows how he helps to cope better with grief in individual consultations. The programme also mentions that he uses his alleged abilities again and again to help the police in unsolved cases. The fact that this cooperation exists was also confirmed in the Johannes B. Kerner Show on Sat.1 in 2009. In the TV crime thriller Tatort: Zwischen zwei Welten, which was produced in Switzerland, there is the character Pablo Guggisberg, who is a medium that helps the police in their investigations. This figure should be based on Pascal Voggenhuber. In Germany, where the general public is unfamiliar with such cooperation, this crime scene episode was sometimes met with incomprehension. In individual cases, schools invite Pascal Voggenhuber to talk to students about his work and these topics, for example in physics lessons. Pascal Voggenhuber has written 14 books so far. Each of these 14 books was in the top 10 bestseller lists in Switzerland.

Documentaries 
 SRF (Schweizer Fernsehen): Pascal Voggenhuber, 2008
 Sat1(TV): Kerner: Pascal Voggenhuber, 2009
 Pascal Voggenhuber im Interview, 2016
 Pascal Voggenhuber im Interview, 2016
 Pascal Voggenhuber erklärt: Aura sehen lernen, 2016
 Pascal Voggenhuber im Interview, 2017

Books 
 Leben in zwei Welten. Geh Deinen Weg! New-Avalun, Sissach 2004; überarbeitete Taschenbuchausgabe: Bastei Lübbe, Bergisch Gladbach 2009, .
 Nachricht aus dem Jenseits. Meine Kontakte mit Verstorbenen und der geistigen Welt. Giger, Altendorf 2008; Knaur, München 2010, .
 Entdecke deinen Geistführer. Wie uns Engel und geistige Wesen begleiten. Giger, Altendorf 2009; Ullstein, Berlin 2012, .
 Entdecke deine Sensitivität. Wie du deine übersinnlichen Fähigkeiten entwickeln kannst. Giger, Altendorf 2010; Ullstein, Berlin 2013, .
 Yoga-Siddhis. Der geheime Weg zu Sensitivität und Medialität (zusammen mit Bahar Yilmaz). Lotos, München 2011, .
 Botschafter der unsichtbaren Welt. Wie der Dialog mit dem Jenseits unser Leben bereichert und heilt. Ansata, München 2011; Heyne, München 2012, .
 Die Geistige Welt hilft uns. Rituale mit Engeln und Geistführern. Giger, Altendorf 2012, .
 Kinder in der Geistigen Welt. Giger, Altendorf 2013, .
 Zünde dein inneres Licht an Giger, Altendorf 2014, .
 Enjoy this Life: Wie du dein ganzes Potential entfaltest Allegria Verlag, .
Enjoy this Life: In 30 Tagen zu dir selbst: Das Praxisbuch, Allegria Verlag, 
Werde selbstbewusst im Schlaf: In 30 Tagen selbstsicher und glücklich, Enjoy this Life Verlag, 
Nachricht aus dem Jenseits 2.0, Giger, 
Love yourself: Weil du der wichtigste Mensch in deinem Leben bist, Giger, Altendorf 2019, 
Heal yourself: Wie du deine Selbstheilungskräfte aktivierst, Giger, Altendorf 2021,

CDs 
 Begegnung in der Stille. Schutzengel- und Geistführer-Meditationen. Nova MD Verlag, 2016, .
 Heilung durch Selbstheilung. Heilmeditationen. Nova MD Verlag, 2016, .
 Öffne dein drittes Auge. Meditation mit Suggestionen. Nova MD Verlag, 2016, .
 Glaub an dich. Meditation mit Suggestionen. Nova MD Verlag, 2016, .
 Enjoy this Life-Geniesse dein Leben. Suggestionen. Lebensraum Verlag, 2016, .
 Enjoy this Life-Gesunder Schlaf. Lebensraum Verlag, 2016, .

References

External links 
 Official website von Pascal Voggenhuber 
Official website  von Chris Grail 
 

1980 births
Living people
Swiss writers
Spiritual mediums
Swiss psychics